Major actinides is a term used in the nuclear power industry that refers to the plutonium and uranium present in used nuclear fuel, as opposed to the minor actinides neptunium, americium, curium, berkelium, and californium.